The 28th New York State Legislature, consisting of the New York State Senate and the New York State Assembly, met from November 6, 1804, to April 10, 1805, during the first year of Morgan Lewis's governorship, in Albany.

Background
Under the provisions of the New York Constitution of 1777, amended by the Constitutional Convention of 1801, 32 Senators were elected on general tickets in the four senatorial districts for four-year terms. They were divided into four classes, and every year eight Senate seats came up for election. Assemblymen were elected countywide on general tickets to a one-year term, the whole assembly being renewed annually.

In 1797, Albany was declared the State capital, and all subsequent Legislatures have been meeting there ever since. In 1799, the Legislature enacted that future Legislatures meet on the last Tuesday of January of each year unless called earlier by the governor.

In 1804, Seneca County was split from Cayuga County, and was apportioned one seat in the Assembly, taken from Cayuga.

U.S. Senator John Armstrong resigned on June 30, 1804, after his appointment as U.S. Minister to France.

At this time the politicians were divided into two opposing political parties: the Federalists and the Democratic-Republicans. The Democratic-Republican Party was split into two opposing factions: the "Regulars" who supported Morgan Lewis, and the "Burrites" who supported Vice President Aaron Burr. Lewis, the Chief Justice of the New York Supreme Court, had been nominated for Governor by his party, but Burr, after being dropped from the presidential ticket in favor of Gov. George Clinton, ran against Lewis. Burr also received the support of the majority of the Federalists although his enemy Alexander Hamilton, the leader of the Federalists, advocated against it and supported Lewis.

Elections
The State election was held from April 24 to 26, 1804. Morgan Lewis was elected Governor of New York, and State Senator John Broome was elected Lieutenant Governor of New York.

Senators William Denning and Ebenezer Purdy (both Southern D.) were re-elected. Samuel Brewster, Stephen Hogeboom (both Middle D.) and Henry Huntington (Western D.); and Assemblymen Thomas Thomas (Southern D.), Stephen Thorn (Eastern D.) and Jedediah Peck (Western D.) were also elected to Senate. All eight were "regular" Democratic-Republicans.

Sessions
The Legislature met at the Old City Hall in Albany on November 6, 1804, to elect presidential electors; and adjourned on November 12.

Dem.-Rep. Alexander Sheldon was re-elected Speaker.

On November 9, 1804, the Legislature elected 19 presidential electors, all Democratic-Republicans: William Floyd, Sylvester Dering, James Fairlie, Cornelius Bergen, John Haring, Ezra Thompson, Major John Wood, Conrad E. Elmendorf, Stephen Miller, Albert Pawling, Isaac Sargent, Thomas Brooks, Matthias B. Hildreth, Jonas Earll, Sr., Joseph Ellicott, Henry Quackenbos, Adam Comstock, Abraham Bancker and ???. They cast their votes for Thomas Jefferson and George Clinton.

On November 9, 1804, the Legislature elected Samuel L. Mitchill (Dem.-Rep.) to succeed John Armstrong in the U.S. Senate.

The Legislature met for the regular session on January 23, 1805; and adjourned on April 10.

During this session the Merchant's Bank of New York was chartered. The bank had been founded by Federalists in competition to the Bank of the Manhattan Company which was run by Democratic-Republicans. The Democratic-Republican majority of the Assembly of 1804 had not only refused to grant a charter, but actually ordered the Merchant's Bank to shut down by May 1805. During this session, the bank bribed enough legislators to have the charter approved, although the Democratic-Republican leaders advocated strongly against it. Gov. Morgan Lewis, who had been Chief Justice and who was wealthy beyond corruptibility, spoke out in favor of granting the charter. This was resented by the party leaders DeWitt Clinton and Ambrose Spencer, and eventually led to a split of the party into "Lewisites" and "Clintonians".

State Senate

Districts
The Southern District (6 seats) consisted of Kings, New York, Queens, Richmond, Suffolk and Westchester counties.
The Middle District (8 seats) consisted of Dutchess, Orange, Ulster, Columbia, Delaware, Rockland and Greene counties.
The Eastern District (9 seats) consisted of Washington, Clinton, Rensselaer, Albany, Saratoga, Essex and Montgomery counties.
The Western District (9 seats) consisted of Herkimer, Ontario, Otsego, Tioga, Onondaga, Schoharie, Steuben, Chenango, Oneida, Cayuga, Genesee and Seneca counties.

Note: There are now 62 counties in the State of New York. The counties which are not mentioned in this list had not yet been established, or sufficiently organized, the area being included in one or more of the abovementioned counties.

Members
The asterisk (*) denotes members of the previous Legislature who continued in office as members of this Legislature. Thomas Thomas, Stephen Thorn and Jedediah peck changed from the Assembly to the Senate.

Employees
Clerk: Henry I. Bleecker

State Assembly

Districts

Albany County (6 seats)
Cayuga County (2 seats)
Chenango County (4 seats)
Clinton County (1 seat)
Columbia County (4 seats)
Delaware County (2 seats)
Dutchess County (7 seats)
Essex County (1 seat)
Genesee and Ontario counties (3 seats)
Greene County (2 seats)
Herkimer County (3 seats)
Kings County (1 seat)
Montgomery County (5 seats)
The City and County of New York (9 seats)
Oneida County (4 seats)
Onondaga County (2 seats)
Orange County (4 seats)
Otsego County (4 seats)
Queens County (3 seats)
Rensselaer County (5 seats)
Richmond County (1 seat)
Rockland County (1 seat)
Saratoga County (4 seats)
Schoharie County (2 seats)
Seneca County (1 seat)
Steuben County (1 seat)
Suffolk County (3 seats)
Tioga County (1 seat)
Ulster County (4 seats)
Washington County (6 seats)
Westchester County (4 seats)

Note: There are now 62 counties in the State of New York. The counties which are not mentioned in this list had not yet been established, or sufficiently organized, the area being included in one or more of the abovementioned counties.

Assemblymen
The asterisk (*) denotes members of the previous Legislature who continued as members of this Legislature.

Employees
Clerk: Solomon Southwick
Sergeant-at-Arms: Benjamin Haight
Doorkeeper: Benjamin Whipple

Notes

Sources
The New York Civil List compiled by Franklin Benjamin Hough (Weed, Parsons and Co., 1858) [see pg. 108f for Senate districts; pg. 119 for senators; pg. 148f for Assembly districts; pg. 178 for assemblymen; pg. 320 and 324 for presidential election]
The History of Political Parties in the State of New-York, from the Ratification of the Federal Constitution to 1840 by Jabez D. Hammond (4th ed., Vol. 1, H. & E. Phinney, Cooperstown, 1846; pages 202-221)
Election result Assembly, Albany Co. at project "A New Nation Votes", compiled by Phil Lampi, hosted by Tufts University Digital Library
Election result Assembly, Clinton Co. at project "A New Nation Votes"
Election result Assembly, Delaware Co. at project "A New Nation Votes"
Election result Assembly, Dutchess Co. at project "A New Nation Votes"
Election result Assembly, Essex Co. at project "A New Nation Votes"
Election result Assembly, Herkimer Co. at project "A New Nation Votes"
Election result Assembly, Kings Co. at project "A New Nation Votes" [gives wrong result]
Election result Assembly, Montgomery Co. at project "A New Nation Votes"
Election result Assembly, Onondaga Co. at project "A New Nation Votes"
Election result Assembly, Orange Co. at project "A New Nation Votes"
Election result Assembly, Queens Co. at project "A New Nation Votes"
Election result Assembly, Rensselaer Co. at project "A New Nation Votes" [gives wrong first name "John" instead of "James" L. Hogeboom]
Election result Assembly, Saratoga Co. at project "A New Nation Votes"
Election result Assembly, Ulster Co. at project "A New Nation Votes"
Partial election result Senate, Southern D. at project "A New Nation Votes" [gives only votes from Richmond, Kings and Suffolk counties]
Partial election result Senate, Middle D. at project "A New Nation Votes" [gives only votes from Delaware, Dutchess, Orange and Ulster counties]
Partial election result Senate, Eastern D. at project "A New Nation Votes" [omits votes from Washington Co.]
Partial election result Senate, Western D. at project "A New Nation Votes" [gives only votes from Herkimer Co.]

1804 in New York (state)
1805 in New York (state)
028
1804 U.S. legislative sessions